Ákos Koller (born 4 September 1974 in Baia Mare, Romania) is a Romanian-born Hungarian former football player. His uncle, Alexandru Koller was also a footballer.

References

External links
 
 
 Magyarfutball profile 

1974 births
Living people
Sportspeople from Baia Mare
Romanian sportspeople of Hungarian descent
Hungarian footballers
Hungary international footballers
Association football defenders
Ferencvárosi TC footballers
Szombathelyi Haladás footballers
Százhalombattai LK footballers
Vác FC players
Budaörsi SC footballers
Csepel SC footballers
BFC Siófok players
Fehérvár FC players
Kecskeméti TE players